Statistics of Kyrgyzstan League for the 2000 season.

Overview
It was contested by 12 teams, and SKA PVO Bishkek won the championship.

League standings

References
Kyrgyzstan - List of final tables (RSSSF)

Kyrgyzstan League seasons
1
Kyrgyzstan
Kyrgyzstan